Gregory Ray Sutton (born December 3, 1967) is an American former professional basketball player who was selected by the San Antonio Spurs in the second round (49th pick overall) of the 1991 NBA draft. Sutton, a 6'2" (1.88 m) and 170 lb (77 kg) point guard, played for Spurs, Charlotte Hornets and Philadelphia 76ers in three seasons. In his NBA career, Sutton played in a total of 168 games and averaged 4.5 ppg. He played collegiately at Langston University and Oral Roberts University.

External links
NBA statistics @ basketballreference.com
European profile

1967 births
Living people
AEL Limassol B.C. players
African-American basketball players
American expatriate basketball people in Cyprus
American expatriate basketball people in Greece
American expatriate basketball people in Israel
American expatriate basketball people in Italy
American expatriate basketball people in Spain
American men's basketball players
Apollon Patras B.C. players
Basketball players from California
Basketball players from Oklahoma
CB Girona players
Charlotte Hornets players
Fargo-Moorhead Fever players
Fort Wayne Fury players
Hapoel Holon players
Idaho Stampede (CBA) players
Langston Lions basketball players
Liga ACB players
Montecatiniterme Basketball players
Oral Roberts Golden Eagles men's basketball players
Peiraikos Syndesmos B.C. players
Philadelphia 76ers players
Point guards
Quad City Thunder players
San Antonio Spurs draft picks
San Antonio Spurs players
Sportspeople from Oklahoma City
Sportspeople from Santa Cruz, California
Victoria Libertas Pallacanestro players
21st-century African-American people
20th-century African-American sportspeople